Verzuolo is a comune (municipality) in the Province of Cuneo in the Italian region Piedmont, located about  southwest of Turin and about  north of Cuneo.

The municipality of Verzuolo contains the frazioni (subdivisions, mainly villages and hamlets) Falicetto, Villanovetta, Papò, Chiamina, S. Bernardo, and Pomerolo.

Verzuolo borders the following municipalities: Costigliole Saluzzo, Lagnasco, Manta, Pagno, Piasco, Savigliano, Villafalletto.

Notable people 
People born in Verzuolo, or with close links to it, have included:
Giuseppe Siccardi (Verzuolo, 3 October 1802 – Turin, 29 October 1857) was an Italian jurist and politician.
Alessandra Boarelli (Turin, 1838 – Verzuolo, 1908) was an Italian mountaineer and, in 1864, became the first woman to summit Monviso.
Cesare Billia (Verzuolo, 1863 – Libya, 14 June 1915) was an Italian soldier, 63rd Infantry Regiment officer and recipient of a gold medal and a silver medal for military valor.
Giovanni Vincenzo Cima (Verzuolo, 22 July 1893 – Turin, 5 July 1968) was an Italian journalist, world-renowned stenographer and creator of his own shorthand system.
Cesare Segre (born 4 April 1928 in Verzuolo, Province of Cuneo) is an Italian philologist, semiotician and literary critic of Jewish descent, currently the Director of the Texts and Textual Traditions Research Centre of the Institute for Advanced Studies of Pavia (IUSS).
Flavio Briatore (born 12 April 1959 in Verzuolo) is a financier, former executive of the Benetton Group, team principal for the Benetton and Renault Formula One teams, and chairman of Queens Park Rangers F.C.

Demographic evolution

See also
Castle of Verzuolo

References

External links
 www.verzuolo.com